Lynn Culbreath Noel (January 9, 1926 in Philadelphia, Pennsylvania - December 25, 2016 in San Diego, California) was an American news reporter.

Although born in Philadelphia, the Culbreath family moved to Norristown, Pennsylvania shortly after her birth. After matriculating from Rittenhouse High School, she graduated from Meharry Medical College in Nashville, Tennessee and the University of Denver. She married Andrew J. Noel, Jr. in 1945, giving birth to two daughters and one son.

Hired by KMGH, Channel 7 as a news reporter in 1965, she was promoted to Public Affairs Director and transferred to Channel 7's affiliate in Bakersfield, California in 1973, remaining with the station until her retirement in 1996. Mrs. Noel has been awarded numerous times for her in-depth documentaries. In the 1970s, she became the first African-American female news reporter to appear on a Denver television station.

Mrs. Noel is the sister of summer Olympic bronze medal winner Josh Culbreath, and sister-in-law of Gladys Noel Bates and Rachel B. Noel.

References

1926 births
2016 deaths
Television personalities from Philadelphia
University of Denver alumni
American television journalists
American women television journalists
Journalists from Pennsylvania
21st-century American women